The 2013 season was Pahang's 23rd consecutive season in the top flight of Malaysian football. Pahang's victory in the 2013 Malaysia Cup for the third time in their history, last time they won are 21 years ago.

Coaching staff

Other information

|-
||General Secretary|| Fuzzemi Ibrahim
|-

|}

Players

First-team squad

Reserve squad

Transfers

In

Out

For recent transfers, see List of Malaysian football transfers 2012

Competitions

Competition record

2013 Malaysia Cup

The Final will be played on 3 Nov 2013 at Shah Alam Stadium, Shah Alam.

Malaysia Super League

Malaysia FA Cup

Malaysia Cup

Group stage

Knockout phase

References

Sri Pahang FC
Sri Pahang FC seasons
2013 in Malaysian football
Malaysian football clubs 2013 season